Hardings Wood Junction is a canal junction near Kidsgrove, Staffordshire, England and the point at which the Macclesfield Canal (or, historically, the Hall Green Branch) joins the Trent and Mersey Canal. It opened in 1831.

History
The Trent and Mersey Canal was authorised by an Act of Parliament in 1766, and construction began at once. After rising through 40 locks from Shardlow on the River Trent, the  canal had a short summit section, most of which was through the  Harecastle Tunnel, before it began its descent through another 36 locks to reach Preston Brook and the Bridgewater Canal. It was completed in 1777.

From the time of its opening, there were plans for a canal through Macclesfield, but no firm action was taken until 1824. Thomas Telford produced a survey in 1825, and an Act of Parliament was obtained in 1826, but although it was based on Telford's design, he did not oversee the work, which was managed by William Crosley. At the same time, Brindley's original tunnel at Harecastle was sinking, and Telford's new tunnel was authorised in 1823, which would be larger than the old one, and would incorporate a towpath. It was slightly longer, at  but was completed in just over two years, opening on 16 March 1827. The Trent and Mersey were keen to ensure that none of their limited water supply was lost to the Macclesfield Canal, and obtained an Act of Parliament in 1827, which gave them powers to build the first  of it, to Hall Green Stop Lock. They insisted that the water level of the Macclesfield canal should be maintained  higher than their section, which was known as the Hall Green Branch, so that water passed from the Macclesfield Canal, rather than to it. The canal, and hence the junction, opened in 1831.

Location
The junction lies close to the northern portal of the Harecastle Tunnel. The Trent and Mersey Canal turns to the west after leaving the tunnel, and the Hall Green Branch initially turns off to the south. There is a sharp right-hand bend, after which it runs parallel to the main line, which descends through two locks. There is then another sharp right-hand bend, and the branch crosses over the main line on an aqueduct. Since both canals are now managed by British Waterways, the Hall Green Branch is usually considered to be part of the Macclesfield Canal. Travelling south, the other end of the summit is at lock 40, just after Etruria Junction, where the Caldon Canal joins the main line.

See also

Canals of the United Kingdom
History of the British canal system

Bibliography

References

Macclesfield Canal
Trent and Mersey Canal
Canal junctions in England
Kidsgrove